A microphone blocker is a phone microphone connector used to trick feature phones that have a physical microphone switch to disconnect the microphone. Microphone blockers won't operate on smartphones or laptops because the microphone is controlled with software rather than a physical switch.

Safety test
Hardware devices should always be tested if it is controlled by software which renders a microphone blocker useless. This can simply be done by plugging a headset or a microphone to the jack try to activate the internal microphone (eg with speaker mode on smartphones or feature phones and speak near the phone while keeping the microphone at distance or plugged), or any program that always will use the internal microphone for other hardware devices like laptops.

Working alternatives for modern hardware devices

 Hardware kill switch (HKS): Some hardware devices can physically disconnect and/or cut power to integrated components with security switches.
 Hacking of consumer electronics: Whistleblower Edward Snowden showed Wired correspondent Shane Smith how to remove the cameras and microphones from a smartphone. The only practical ways are to physically removing all the internal microphones (there can be more than one, like a noise cancellation mic) and only plug headsets and using the headset microphone to record when needed.
 Modular hardware: Cameras and microphones can be physically removed from modular hardware.

Smartphone incompatibility
Microphone blockers, including commercial microphone blockers with an integrated circuit marketed to provide "extra security", are not useful for smartphones because it is controlled entirely by software. It can be demonstrated by connecting a microphone blocker to a smartphone, and make a phone call with speaker mode which will also active the internal microphone.

However, although they would work, there are further problems:
 Since Apple started to exclude the headphone jack in 2016 from iPhone 7, iPhone 7 Plus and later versions, more and more phone companies are eliminating it. 3.5 mm TRRS male microphone blocker adapters with connectors to Lightning cables exist, and cables with USB-C connectors can be produced. Apple has filed dozens of wireless patents, and there are rumors that they are planning to produce products without lightning ports in the future to make them completely wireless. Bluetooth vendors advise customers with vulnerable Bluetooth devices to either turn them off in areas regarded as unsafe or set them to undiscoverable. Portable Bluetooth adapters for wired headsets, can be used as workaround to connect the microphone blocker to wireless hardware devices with Bluetooth connectivity, however while making them susceptible to bluesnarfing.
 Some hardware devices (eg some Google Nexus smartphones) have in addition to the internal recording microphone an internal noise cancellation microphone that may be on all the time, or that may be on in a way that is independent from what is plugged into the audio jack connector.

Feature phone compatibility

A phone connector without a microphone channel cannot be used as a microphone blocker because it will not deactivate the external microphone. Three- or four-conductor ( or ) 2.5 mm and 3.5 mm sockets are common on older cell phones and newer smartphones respectively, providing mono (three conductor) or stereo (four conductor) sound and a microphone input, together with signaling (e.g., push a button to answer a call).

Older hardware devices
CTIA/AHJ is the de facto TRRS standard. OMTP was mostly used on older hardware devices. However, the old mobile phones have a 2.5 mm jack connectors socket and cannot be used with modern microphone blockers that are typically 3.5 mm, but old mobile phones are notorious for their low security of the hardware itself. If a CTIA headset is connected to a mobile phone with OMTP interface, the external microphone will stay active. There, internal microphone will only be active when holding the microphone key on the headset. A standard TCIA/AHJ TRRS microphone blocker cannot be used with OMTP socket hardware devices and it is recommended to test all microphone blockers to make sure they really work.

Operation
Microphone blockers disable the internal microphone by tricking the device into believing an external microphone is connected. A 3.5 mm microphone blocker with just  channel is enough to disconnect the internal microphone, but most commercial microphone blockers have  connections which in theory makes them headset blockers that in smartphones also disconnect the internal speaker in media player software because they will try to connect to the headphones, while ringtones, and alarms, will functioning as normal because they will use both the internal speaker and the external speaker(s).

Successful operation of a microphone blocker depends on the internal scheme of the mobile device, which may fully block the microphone without possibility of recovering data, or just disregard the signal from internal microphone with the possibility of recording if needed.

Issues
Some devices allow internal and external microphone works simultaneously or may not recognize when an external microphone is connected.

Types

Microphone blocking plug

A microphone blocking plug is a phone connector with a microphone channel that cannot be used due to the plugged end. Some products are shipped with a female connectors (with a keychain hole, or a small strap attached directly to smartphone cases) to prevent loss when the male connector is detached. A mobile phone charm (especially with TRS connector instead of a rubber plug) can be used to conceal a dummy blocker.

A microphone blocking plug can be used to debug software-defined radio that demands a connector to be plugged but they cannot be used to stream radio due to its low antenna efficiency.

Life hack

Common products that can be used as microphone blockers:
 A soldering jack plug (TR, TRS, or TRRS), with metal or plastic base - A slim plug with right angle is recommended to fit the jack plug hole in smartphone cases and to not cause frictions in the socket.
 A TRRS male-male jack plug cable - Another cheap solution that provides two microphone blocking plugs, the cost per plug is usually cheaper than commercial microphone blocking plugs. The cable can either be cut to provide two separate plugs or be left intact to allow plugging into two mobile phones.
 A headphone cable with microphone, a wired headset, or a wired microphone - More expensive and will provide just one blocking plug.

It's possible that microphone connectors without a microphone circuit like the above solutions offer low security, because when you plug a connector that has no microphone or microphone circuit, software has the ability to override the default behavior.

Microphone blocking adapter
Headset with an integrated microphone blocker also exist, allowing users to use the headphones (ie. for listening to music) without risking being eavesdropped. Microphone blocking adapters are phone connectors adapters with a microphone channel and a mechanism that produces a false positive signal simulating a connected microphone. This mechanism cannot be built by pairing multiple connectors: a headset connected to a 3.5 mm TRRS headset extension cable adapter further connected to a 3.5 TRS headphone cable adapter won't trick a connected mobile phone to disconnect its external microphone.

Applications
This section describes use for both microphone blocking plugs and adapters.

Use

Eavesdropping protection for feature phones

A microphone blocker is a cheap, simple accessory that provides countersurveillance against eavesdropping, for example recording eavesdropping from interception (like cellphone surveillance), or phone hacking, but it doesn't work on smartphones because they are controlled by software. However, there are a variety of computing vulnerabilities like proprietary software and firmware, backdoors, hardware security bugs, hardware backdoors, hardware Trojans, spyware, and malware programs that can turn on a mobile device's microphone remotely, and the vast majority of devices do not have internal hardware protection to prevent eavesdropping. Most antivirus software, and anti-spying software does not guarantee that the microphone will be fully blocked or disabled and can even be prevented doing so by spyware and malware that are constantly changing and improving.

Leaked documents published by WikiLeaks, codenamed Vault 7 and dated from 2013 to 2016, described the capabilities of the United States Central Intelligence Agency (CIA) to perform electronic surveillance and cyber warfare, including the ability to compromise the operating systems of most smartphones, turning them into permanent listening devices. Millions of smartphones could also be vulnerable to software cracking via accelerometers.

A new acoustic cryptanalysis technique discovered by a research team at Israel's Ben-Gurion University Cybersecurity Research Center allows data to be extracted using a computer's speakers and headphones. Forbes published a report stating that researchers found a way to see information being displayed, by using microphone, with 96.5% accuracy.

Pocket dialing protection
A microphone blocker is useful to prevent a mobile phone against audio interception from pocket dialing.

Abuse

Social engineering
A person can wiretap conversations from persons they with social engineering have deceived that microphone blockers are safe to use with smartphones. This can in theory be exploited by companies that manufacture and sell commercial microphone blockers if they require a mobile phone number when people order their products or ask for support.

Marketing ethic issue
Manufacturers of commercial microphone blockers with 3.5 mm phone jacks intended for smartphones, sometimes claim that they their blocker has an inbuilt semiconductor integrated circuit (sometimes patented form marketing purpose) that will offer superior security but doesn't give any security at all, they just deceive people to make money on them. This has raised questions about marketing ethics.

See also
 Crypto phone
 Faraday cage
 Mobile phone jammer
 Mobile phone accessory
 Mobile security
 Secure voice

References

External links
 How to keep snoops from listening to your laptop's microphone
 Keep hackers from listening through your computer with plug
  

Telephone connectors
Hardware device blockers
Social engineering (computer security)
Confidence tricks